Shakeel Ahmad Bhat (born around 1978)  is a Kashmiri activist. He has been in photographs on the front pages of many newspapers and has become a cult figure on the Internet. He has been featured in newspapers such as the Times of India, Middle East Times, France 24, and The Sunday Mail He has been nicknamed Islamic Rage Boy by several bloggers.

Biography
He was born into a Sufi Muslim family in Jammu and Kashmir, India. He claims that, around 1990,  during a raid on his home, Indian police threw his sister Shareefa out of an upstairs window; she allegedly broke her spine and died four years later.

He lives in Indian Administered Kashmir, where he is often seen participating in demonstrations. Due to his angry look, he is often photographed by journalists. He took part in protests against the Indian Army, Israel, Pope Benedict, Salman Rushdie, and the Muhammed cartoons.  He spent three years in prison. He claims that he has been detained almost 300 times since 1997.

In popular culture 
He was featured in numerous blogs and articles by Christopher Hitchens, Kathleen Parker, Michelle Malkin, and others. On various blogs, he was photoshopped as Aerosmith singer Steven Tyler or as an opera singer. His picture has also been printed on T-shirts, posters, mouse-pads, and beer mugs.<ref

name=autogenerated1/>

See also
Islam
List of Internet phenomena

References

External links
Muslim 'Rage Boy' says he's really angry

Internet memes
Kashmiri people
Living people
People from Jammu and Kashmir
Rage (emotion)
Year of birth missing (living people)
Indian Muslim activists